Ramiro Valdés Menéndez (born 28 April 1932) is a Cuban politician. He became a Government Vice President in the 2009 shake-up by Raúl Castro.

Biography
A veteran of the Cuban Revolution, Valdés fought alongside Fidel Castro at the attack on the Moncada Barracks in 1953 and was a founding member of the 26th of July Movement. He has been a member of the Politburo of the Communist Party of Cuba since October 1965, and has held many important governmental posts, including those of Interior Minister and Vice-Prime Minister. On 31 August 2006, he was named Minister of Informatics and Communications.

In 1960, he was a member of Raul Castro delegation that visited Czechoslovakia where he received intelligence training.

He is the father of the Cuban composer Ramiro Valdés Puentes, awarded Cuba's First National Prize of Composition, who currently lives in Miami and in 2004 was the protagonist of a Telemundo 51 news series titled "The Commander's Son".

Minister of the Interior

By 1969, the Politburo, the former central policy-making and governing body of the Cuban Communist party, decided to remove Valdés from the Ministry of the Interior, replacing him with Sergio del Valle Jiménez, a comandante and MINFAR's first deputy minister.

In 1978, Fidel removed del Valle and brought back Valdés as Minister of the Interior. Expectations for improvement failed, and personal rivalries and tensions increased.

By the time of the Third Party Congress in 1986, Valdés was again gone as Minister of the Interior and as a member of the Politburo and it seemed as if his political career was over.

But then, he landed a new job as director of national electronics (Copextel). In the beginning, it was a very small project, but soon it became the hub for the development of Cuba's telecom, software and IT industry—in growing association with Japanese, Korean, and Chinese enterprises.

The 1990s was Copextel's coming-of-age and also heralded the creation of Cuba's Industrial Group for Electronics, attached to the Ministry of Steel and Machinery (SIME).

Later this Industrial Group of Electronics came under the Ministry of Information Technology and Communications. In less than 10 years, Valdés' group had become the single most important entity within the new ministry, obviously becoming the man to replace the outgoing minister.

In February 2007, Valdés defended Internet restrictions as a response to US aggression. The Internet "constitutes one of the tools for global extermination" he said, referring to US policies, "but is also necessary to continue to advance down the path of development."

At an international conference on communications in Havana, Valdés defended Cuba's "rational and efficient" use of the Internet but warned that "the wild colt of new technologies can and must be controlled."

He was once again readmitted to the Politburo after Raúl's official nomination as President of the Council of State in February 2008.

In February 2010 Valdés, based on declarations from Cuba and Venezuela, visited Venezuela as part of a Cuban delegation that was intended to "help Venezuela reduce energy consumption".

Retirement
In April 2021, it was agreed that Valdés would not rejoin the Politburo of the Cuban government.

References

External links
Biography by CIDOB (in Spanish)

1932 births
Living people
People from Havana
Interior ministers of Cuba
Information ministers of Cuba
Cuban revolutionaries
Cuban soldiers
Communist Party of Cuba politicians
People of the Cuban Revolution